The 2018 CONIFA World Football Cup was the third edition of the CONIFA World Football Cup, an international football tournament for states, minorities, stateless peoples and regions unaffiliated with FIFA organised by CONIFA. The tournament was hosted by Barawa Football Association, with all games held in and around London. The tournament was sponsored by Irish bookmaker Paddy Power. After being a late entry to the tournament, Kárpátalja won their first title on 9 June 2018, defeating Northern Cyprus 3–2 on penalties in the final (0–0 after 90 minutes).

Host selection
In June 2017, at the CONIFA meeting held during the 2017 CONIFA European Football Cup, it was announced that the Barawa Football Association had been selected to act as the host for the 2018 CONIFA World Football Cup. However, under CONIFA's criteria, the "host" is the CONIFA member that heads the organising committee for the tournament, which does not necessarily mean that it needs to be played in the host's territory. Barawa is located in Somalia, but the Barawa FA represents members of the Somali diaspora in England.

Venues
The first two CONIFA World Football Cup tournaments both featured no more than two venues each; the 2014 tournament featured all games played at the same stadium, while the 2016 edition had a stadium in each of two cities. The expansion from twelve to sixteen participants in 2018 saw a significant expansion in the number of venues used, with a total of ten selected in four separate towns and cities - of these, seven were located in Greater London itself, two were in the towns of Slough and Bracknell in Berkshire, and one in the borough of Thurrock in Essex.

Qualification

The process of qualification for the World Football Cup was originally laid out in a set of criteria published by CONIFA at its 2017 annual general meeting, which goes into the various ways by which teams can qualify. This was subsequently revised by CONIFA in June 2017.
Host - Providing at least 10 places are available for other qualifiers, then all hosts will qualify automatically. If there are less than 10 other places available, then the number of automatic host places is calculated by the total number of places in the tournament minus 10.
World Football Cup Holder - The current holder of the World Football Cup qualifies automatically.
Wild Card - CONIFA's Executive Committee issues a Wild Card place to a team that has not yet qualified for the WFC no later than 9 months prior to the start of the tournament. The committee also has the right to issue a second Wild Card if approved by CONIFA's Annual General Meeting.
Qualification tournament - Any member of CONIFA has the right to request that a tournament it hosts be sanctioned as a qualifier, providing it is held between 1 January of the year of the previous WFC, and 31 December of the year before the next WFC, and consists of at least four CONIFA members. The request to have the tournament sanctioned as a qualifier must be submitted at least two months prior to the start, and must be approved by CONIFA's Executive Committee.
Continental tournament - If a CONIFA continental championship is held after the previous WFC, then a number of its participants qualify for the WFC; the total qualifiers is worked out by the number of participants in the tournament divided by 4.
Qualification points - Remaining places are distributed according to the final positions in the various CONIFA continental rankings according to their accumulated ranking points. If two or more teams have the same number of qualification points, qualification will be determined by the CONIFA World Rankings.

By the criteria set out, the qualification process began in January 2016, when Western Armenia played its first official game against the reserve team of the French club Olympique de Marseille. The first team to qualify automatically was Tamil Eelam, by winning the single match CONIFA Challenger Cup against the Romani people in March 2016. Following this, two further, multi-team competitions were awarded qualification status by CONIFA, the Hungary Heritage Cup, played between four CONIFA members representing the Hungarian diaspora, and the World Unity Cup, which was a tournament containing teams representing a number of displaced peoples. The winners of both of these tournaments were guaranteed qualification for the World Football Cup.

Qualified teams

Draw
In December 2017, the sixteen participating teams were seeded into four pots of four for the group stage draw, based on the ConIFA rankings. The draw for the group stage was  held on 6 January 2018 in Northern Cyprus.

Withdrawals
In March 2018, ConIFA announced that, owing to financial difficulties, the Kiribati team had been forced to withdraw from the tournament, with their place taken by Tuvalu. In May 2018, it was announced that the Felvidék team had withdrawn, to be replaced by Kárpátalja.

Squads

Referees
ConIFA announced a total of 28 referees for the tournament, led by former Premier League official Mark Clattenburg. During the tournament, referees used a third card in addition to the red and yellow; the green card, introduced as a concept by the tournament sponsor Paddy Power, was issued to players either for dissent or diving; a player given a green card was required to be substituted immediately.

Matches

Group stage

Group A

Group B

Group C

Group D

Knockout stage

Quarter-finals

Semi-finals

Third-Place play-off

Final

Placement Rounds

Placement Round 1

Placement Round 2

Placement Round 3

Statistics

Goalscorers
6 goals
  Kamaljit Singh
5 goals

  Calum Ferguson
  Halil Turan
  Barna Bajkó

4 goals

  Ruslan Akhvlediani
  Sami Boudia
  Billy Mehmet
  Giacomo Innocenti

3 goals

  Ruslan Shoniya
  Zsolt Gajdos
  Ronald Takács
  Uğur Gök
  Federico Corno
  Giulio Valente
  Nathan Minhas
  Amar Singh Purewal
  Szilárd Magyari
  Prashanth Ragavan
  Vahagn Militosyan

2 goals

  Shabat Logua
  Dmitri Maskayev
  Mohamed Bettamer
  Shaun Lucien
  Josh Doughty
  Yuri Farkas
  Tayshan Hayden-Smith
  Hector Morales
  Jon Nouble
  Sam Caine
  Stephen Whitley
  Enzo Mezaib
  Gergő Gyürki
  István Sándor
  György Toma
  Thabiso Ndlela
  Shylock Ndlovu
  Gabriele Piantoni
  Riccardo Ravasi
  Nicolò Pavan
  William Rosset
  Amarvir Sandhu
  Gurjit Singh
  Csaba Csizmadia
  Kalsang Topgyal
  Tenzin Yougyal
 Alopua Petoa
  Lee Tong-soung
  Mun Su-hyeon
  Arman Mosoyan
  Vicken Valenza-Berberian

1 goal

  Vladimir Argun
  Aleksandr Kogoniya
  Georgi Zhanaa
  Astamur Tarba
  Gianni Crichlow
  Shaquille Ismail
  Solomon Sambou
  Hamza Haddadi
  Max Oldham
  Frank Jones
  Jack McVey
  Nadjim Bouabbas
  Ilyas Hadid
  Csaba Peres
  György Sándor
  Alex Svedjuk
  Sipho Mlalazi
  Ünal Kaya
  Serhan Önet
  Kenan Oshan
  Tansel Osman
  Ersid Pllumbaj
  Gianluca Rolandone
  Andrea Rota
  Rajpal Singh Virk
  István Fülöp
  Lóránd Fülöp
  Arthur Györgyi
  László Hodgyai
  László Szőcs
  Zsolt Tankó
  Janothan Perananthan
  Sosene Vailine
  Etimoni Timuani
  Shin Yong-ju
  Ken Taniyama
  Fabrice Guzel
  David Hovsepyan
  Norik Hovsepyan
  Zaven Varjabetyan
  Artur Yedigaryan

Own goals
  Ayuub Ali (for )
  Tenzin Gelek (for )

Final positions

Player awards
Three individual awards were handed out by ConIFA at the conclusion of the tournament:

Paddy Power Player of the Tournament:  Béla Fejér
ConIFA Golden Boot:  Kamaljit Singh
Global FCE Young Player of the Tournament:  Sami Boudia

As winner of Young Player of the Tournament, Sami Boudia was offered a one-month residency at one of the Global Football Centre Of Excellence's academies.

Marketing

Tournament programme
A programme for the entire tournament was produced, with the bulk of the content produced by football writer Mat Guy and blogger Pat McGuinness, and produced by Programme Master. The tournament is also documented in detail in the book CONIFA: Football For The Forgotten by journalist James Hendicott, which centres around events in London and the history of the teams involved.

Official anthem
The official anthem of the tournament is "Bring The House Down" by English duo Right Said Fred, which was released on 29 May 2018.

Controversies

Ellan Vannin withdrawal
Following the completion of the group stage, Ellan Vannin entered a protest regarding the fact that Barawa had been able to bring in a replacement player to their squad after the tournament had started, in apparent contravention of the tournament's rules. The addition of the player, Mohamed Bettamer, a former Libyan youth international, was permitted by ConIFA, who stated that this was a rule change, but who did not inform the other 15 teams in the competition, who had submitted their own squad lists according to the published pre-tournament rule book. Ellan Vannin launched an appeal against the Barawa team's fielding of an apparently ineligible player, which at an initial meeting of the tournament committee was upheld, before subsequently being overturned. As a result, Ellan Vannin withdrew from the remainder of the tournament, and Tibet, their opponents in the First Placement Round, were awarded a 3–0 victory. Their place in the remaining fixtures were taken by Chagos Islands. 
 A meeting of ConIFA's Executive Committee made the decision to provisionally expel the Manx Independent Football Alliance from the organization on 7 June, subject to ratification at the Annual General Meeting in January 2019. They were reinstated in January.

Replacement matches

Goalscorers
3 goals
  Hassan Nalbant
2 goals

  Okilani Tinilau
  Matti Uaelasi

1 goal

  Ivanov Leonce
  Musa Sthamburi
  Ali Uyar Avci
  Sosene Vailine

Own goals
  Nicolas Oride (against )

Broadcasting rights
CONIFA provided live streaming through football streaming service Mycujoo and edited highlights provided by FC Video. Select games were also live streamed on the Paddy Power Facebook page.

In Northern Cyprus the games were broadcast by EURO GENÇ TV.

Notes

References

CONIFA World Football Cup
ConIFA
ConIFA
International association football competitions hosted by London
ConIFA
ConIFA World Football Cup
ConIFA World Football Cup